Susana Romero may refer to:

 Susana Romero (actress) (born 1958), Argentine actress
 Susana Romero (sailor) (born 1990), Spanish sailor